Haidara may refer to:
 Haidara, Family name[]

It is also a surname. Notable people with the surname include:
 Amadou Haidara (born 1998), a Malian footballer 
 Aminata Haidara (born 1997), a football player
 Chérif Ousmane Madani Haïdara, a religious leader in Mali, and founder of the Sufi Ansar Dine 
 Mahamane Haidara (1910–1981), a Malian politician, member of French Senate in 1948
 Massadio Haïdara (born 1992), a French football (soccer) player
 Seydou Junior Haidara (born 1989), a Canadian football player

See also 
 Hadara, a neighborhood in Alexandria, Egypt
 Haidar, a name
 Haidara Kontorfilli (1890–1931), a Sierra Leonean charismatic Islamic religious reformer
 Mamma Haidara Commemorative Library, a place in Mali